Md. Kabirul Haque (মোঃ কবিরুল হক) is a Bangladesh Awami League politician and the incumbent Member of Parliament from Narail-1.

Early life
Haque was born on 30 June 1971. He has a M.A. degree.

Career
Haque was elected to Parliament from Narail-1 in 2008 and re-elected on 5 January 2014 as a Bangladesh Awami League candidate. 11th general election on December 30, 2018 he was elected Member of Parliament for 3rd time.

References

Awami League politicians
Living people
1971 births
9th Jatiya Sangsad members
10th Jatiya Sangsad members
11th Jatiya Sangsad members
People from Narail District